Mian Mahalleh (also Romanized as Mīān Maḩalleh; also known as Mīān Maḩalleh-ye Shījān) is a village in Chapar Khaneh Rural District, Khomam District, Rasht County, Gilan Province, Iran. At the 2006 census, its population was 678, in 208 families.

References 

Populated places in Rasht County